Michal Tvrdík (born July 23, 1979) is a Czech professional ice hockey player. He played with HC Plzeň in the Czech Extraliga during the 2010–11 Czech Extraliga season.

References

External links

1979 births
Living people
Czech ice hockey forwards
HC Plzeň players
Sportspeople from Pardubice
Orli Znojmo players
BK Mladá Boleslav players
HC Bílí Tygři Liberec players
HC Karlovy Vary players
HC Dynamo Pardubice players
Stadion Hradec Králové players